Carl Amari (born August 20, 1963) is an American film and television producer, actor, director and syndicated radio host, creator of When Radio Was.

Biography

Amari was born in Chicago, Illinois. He attended Triton College and Columbia College.

He founded the company Radio Spirits, which he sold in 1998 for $12 million.

Amari has acted in several motion picture and television projects, including Madison (2001), which he produced. It opened the Sundance Film Festival.

In 2007, Amari produced the Word of Promise audio Bible (NKJV translation) published by Thomas Nelson, Inc.

Irving Brecher, creator of The Life of Riley, praised Amari for paying royalties, which has historically not been common practice in the radio drama community. Amari has threatened legal action against classic radio show collectors who distribute episodes online. Some in the classic radio community find this problematic, as the community's long history of collecting and sharing episodes is partially credited with the survival of radio shows into the 21st century.

He co-wrote a book, The Top 100 Classic Radio Shows, with Martin Grams Jr. It was published in 2017.

Bibliography 

 The Top 100 Classic Radio Shows, Carl Amari, Martin Grams, 2017

References 

1963 births
Living people
American radio personalities
Triton College alumni
American male actors

External links 

Falcon Picture Group

Columbia College Chicago alumni